Saketharaman (born 24 November 1982) is one of the top performing musicians of Carnatic music in India. He is a prime disciple of Padmabushan Shri Lalgudi Jayaraman. He started learning carnatic vocal from Late Srirangam Krishnamurthy Rao at the age of 4. Subsequently, he learnt under Late Smt. Savitri Satyamurthy. He has learnt several Padams and Javalis from Smt Geetha Raja. He currently learns rare kirthanas of Trinity and other yesteryear composers from Vid Shri Nagai Muralidharan. He also learns voice culture and Hindustani music from Sangeetha Kalanidhi Shri TV Gopalakrishnan.

Composer
Saketharaman has composed more than 100 Pallavis, which are featured regularly in his concerts. These have been composed in rare Thalas. Several thematic pallavis such as "SaptaSwara SaptaRaga SaptaThala", "Ashta Gowlai", "Swarakshara", "Ranjani mala", "Pancha Ranga Kshetra", "Tamil Isai", "Mysuru City" have been composed by Saketharaman.

Tunesmith
Saketharaman also dons the hat of a tunesmith. He has tuned several Mira Bhajans, Purandharadasar Devarnamas, compositions of Annamacharyar, Kanakadasar, Sadhasiva Brahmendral and Subramania Bharathiar. He presented a full-fledged 2.5 hour concert of Shri Adhi Shankaracharyar's works that were set to tune by him in Bengaluru Gayana Samaj. He has also presented an exclusive concert on "vada naadu Divya Desams" of Alwar pasurams, set to tune by him.

Crossover with Saketh
Crossover with Saketh, a brainchild of Vidwan Saketharaman, is a web series intended to enhance the listening experience of Carnatic music. The objective is that the common man should be able to enjoy listening to Carnatic music without any barriers. Crossover is a smash hit, especially with the millennials. Won accolades all over and was featured in Sankara TV Super Singer

Samuditha Foundation
Founded by Vidwan Saketharaman in the year 2020 with a motto of "carnatic music for all". The foundation operates various projects under its auspices -Kalashiksha School, "Penum Pannum " annual concerts etc. The Samuditha Award of Excellence, which includes a cash award, is given for outstanding contribution in Fine Arts.

Pennum Pannum
This annual concert celebrates women composers, bringing forth the contributions by the women composers. The first "Pennum Pannum " concert was held in 2021 at the prestigious Narada Gana Sabha, on the eve of Women's day. The Samuditha Award of Excellence was given to Dr Alamelu Ramakrishnan for her brilliant book on Women composers. The award was given by Founder Vidwan Saketharaman, Shriram Groups MD Akhila Srinivasaa, Dr Nithayasree Mahadevan and popular orator Bharathi Bhaskar.

Kala Shiksha
Saketharaman runs a music school called Kala Shiksha. Over 200 school students learn Carnatic music, Nama Sankeerthanam and Tamil Isai in this school. Objective is to teach Carnatic music, Nama Sankeerthanam and Tamil Isai to all, regardless of economic and social barriers.

Divya Desa Sangeetha Yatrai
Divya Desa Sangeetha Yatrai is a web series-a musical journey to all the Divya Desams. There will be at least one Pasuram of the 12 Alwars that will be sung on every Divya Desam, along with explanation of the Pasuram and the significance of the Divya Desam. The Pasurams are either pre-tuned by legendary carnatic musicians or set to tune by Vidwan Saketharaman or sung in Virutham or free style format. This is available for listening at Saketharaman's official youtube channel.

Awards

Discography

Here is a comprehensive list of his albums
Vandhaan Raghuraman Saketharaman Live at Paris-Swathi Soft Solutions 2012 
Saketharaman, Live concert 2010 in Narada Gana Sabha -Charsur 
Aatma Nivedhanam 2009 -Swathi Soft Solutions along with Vidwan Shri Umayalpuram Sivaraman and Vidwan Shri Mysore Nagaraj
Nadha Geetham 2009-Amudham
Saketharaman, Live concert 2008 in Bharath Sangeeth Utsav-Carnatica
Live concert 2001 in Naradha Gana Sabha-HMV

Personal life

Saketharaman's mother, Vijaya Santhanam, is a postgraduate in Chemistry and an ardent follower of Shri Shri Krishna Premi Swamigal. His father, Santhanam, is a Chartered Accountant. His elder sister, Vishaka Hari is a well known Harikatha exponent. His wife, Vidhya, is a doctor. The couple reside in Chennai and have a daughter and a son.

Press clippings 

https://www.newindianexpress.com/cities/chennai/2021/mar/06/of-lyrics-music-and-carnatic-renditions-2272795.html
https://www.thehindu.com/entertainment/music/exploring-the-carnatic-film-music-link/article32174121.ece
https://indianexpress.com/article/india/saketharaman-interview-carnatic-music-margazhi-festival-ilayaraja-hindustani-music-5490268
https://www.thehindu.com/entertainment/music/music-in-the-brain/article25910819.ece
https://www.thehindu.com/entertainment/music/an-exuberant-confluence/article25443331.ece
https://www.thehindu.com/entertainment/music/renowned-musicians-brought-out-their-best-at-the-recent-nine-day-vasanthothsavam-in-thrissur/article23969252.ece
https://www.thehindu.com/entertainment/music/saketharaman-presented-compositions-in-an-engaging-manner/article22135398.ece
https://www.thehindu.com/entertainment/music/a-spirited-showcase-of-skills/article18260960.ece
https://www.thehindu.com/features/friday-review/music/saketharaman-walking-the-known-path/article7403465.ece
http://www.thehindu.com/features/friday-review/sangeethotsavam-2014-review/article6636168.ece
http://www.thehindu.com/features/friday-review/navarasas-well-defined/article8000313.ece
http://www.thehindu.com/chennai-margazhi-season/touch-of-flamboyance/article6672796.ece
http://www.thehindu.com/arts/music/article100691.ece

http://www.thehindu.com/arts/music/article995739.ece
http://www.thehindu.com/arts/music/article35805.ece
http://www.deccanherald.com/content/166263/impressive-vocal-concert-vid-saketharaman.html
http://www.thehindu.com/arts/music/article2440077.ece

https://archive.today/20130222080357/http://www.timeoutmumbai.net/music/live-preview/s-saketharaman
http://sydhwaney.com/a-partnership-of-power-and-prowess/
http://www.thehindu.com/todays-paper/tp-features/tp-fridayreview/poignant-picture-of-ragas/article4296268.ece
http://www.thehindu.com/arts/music/devotional-fervour/article4364694.ece#.
http://www.deccanherald.com/content/233232/good-improvisation-holds-listeners.html
http://www.deccanherald.com/content/234989/ipl-2012.html
http://www.deccanherald.com/content/17527/F

External links
https://saketharaman.com

Male Carnatic singers
Carnatic singers
Singers from Chennai
1982 births
21st-century Indian male classical singers
Living people